Matt Nunez (born March 25, 1989) is an American floorball player who plays as a defender. He has won eight caps for the United States national floorball team and represented the United States at the 2016 World Floorball Championships in Riga, Latvia.

Floorball career 
In April 2015, Nunez helped the Dallas-based floorball team the Lonestar Lions win the 2015 Southwest US Floorball Championship in Keene, Texas. He also played at the 2015 Lonestar Invitational Floorball Tournament (LIFT) in Arlington, Texas alongside fellow international floorballer Patrick Dousa, as the Lonestar Lions won another trophy. Nunez was named in the All-Tournament Team for his efforts in the competition.

In the following year, Nunez made his international debut for the United States national floorball team during the 2016 World Floorball Championships qualifying campaign as he played in games against both Jamaica and Canada. He scored his first international goal in the 27–1 win against Jamaica as the United States qualified for the 2016 World Floorball Championships in Riga, Latvia.

In December 2016, Nunez was part of the United States team that finished eleventh at the 2016 World Floorball Championships after winning Group D ahead of Canada, Singapore, and Thailand before being eliminated in the play-off round by Germany.

Career statistics

International 

 Scores and results list United States' goal tally first, score column indicates score after each Nunez goal.

Honors 
Lonestar Lions
 Southwest US Floorball Championship: 2015

 Lonestar Invitational Floorball Tournament (LIFT): 2015
Individual

 All-Tournament Team, Lonestar Invitational Floorball Tournament (LIFT): 2015

References 

1989 births
Living people
Floorball players
American floorball players